Real Sociedad HH was an ice hockey team based in Donostia-San Sebastián in the Basque Country of northeastern Spain. The team played in the Superliga Espanola de Hockey Hielo (Spanish Ice Hockey Superliga) from 1972–1976, where they won both the Spanish Championship and the Copa del Rey in 1973, 1974, and 1975. 

The club’s home arena was Txuri Urdin Izotz Jauregia.

History
In 1972, the sports club Real Sociedad established a new section for ice hockey, called “Real Sociedad Hockey Hielo (HH).” The team was one of the six founding teams to compete in the newly created Superliga Espanola de Hockey Hielo. 

Real Sociedad HH were a strong team and they saw immediate success, winning the inaugural Superliga Espanola de Hockey Hielo Championship in 1972–73 and the 1973 Copa del Rey de Hockey Hielo. They remained dominant in the following two seasons, winning both the Superliga Championship and the Copa del Rey in 1973–74 and 1974–75 seasons. 

In the 1975–76 season, Real Sociedad HH was not the powerhouse it had been in the previous three seasons and finished fifth in the Superliga. CHH Txuri Urdin IHT, which had originally been created in 1972 as the reserve team for Real Sociedad HH, played in Superliga for the first time in the 1975–76 season and finished first in the league. Finnish coach Jorma Thusberg served as head coach to both Real Sociedad and Txuri Urdin. As a result, the Real Sociedad HH team was merged with CCH Txuri Urdin IHT and the hockey section of Real Sociedad was dissolved before the 1976–77 season.

Though both teams played in the Superliga for the 1975–76 season, the Spanish Ice Sports Federation (RFEDH) lists both teams as one franchise when discussing the total Superliga/Liga Championships and Copas del Rey won.

Achievements
Superliga Española de Hockey Hielo
Champions (3) : 1973, 1974, 1975
Copa del Rey de Hockey Hielo
Winner (3) : 1973, 1974, 1975
Source(s):

Season by season

Source(s):

References
Content in this article is translated from the existing Basque Wikipedia article at :eu:Real Sociedad (izotz hockeya) and the existing Spanish Wikipedia article at :es:Club Hockey Hielo Txuri Urdin; see their histories for attribution.

External links 

 Team information and statistics from Eliteprospects.com, and Eurohockey.com, and Hockeyarchives.info (in French)

Ice hockey teams in the Basque Country
Ice hockey clubs established in 1972
Ice hockey clubs disestablished in 1976
Real Sociedad
1972 establishments in Spain
1976 disestablishments in Spain
Defunct ice hockey teams in Europe